"Who Am I (Sim Simma)", or simply "Who Am I", is a reggae single released by dancehall artist Beenie Man in 1998.  It is the second track on his album Many Moods of Moses released in 1997.

The song is based on the "Playground" riddim (instrumental accompaniment), which was produced by Jeremy Harding. According to Harding, "Beenie Man had heard the riddim 'Playground' on several occasions and loved it. He had even written a tune already when he arrived at the studio to voice without any prior notice. I heard a knocking one morning...and couldn't believe when I saw Beenie Man sitting outside complaining about how long he had been banging down the door. I turned on the equipment, and he went straight into the booth to record a perfect version of "Who Am I" in what seemed like one take."

The track helped to introduce Beenie Man to the world as a new reggae star in the pages of Newsweek and other major media outlets. He used a portion of this song in his reggae fusion single "Girls Dem Sugar" featuring Mýa which was released in 2000.

This song was featured on the NBA 2K22 soundtrack.

Chart success
The song reached No. 10 in the UK Singles Chart and was his first top 40 hit in the UK. On the US Billboard charts, the song reached No. 6 on their Hot Rap Singles chart. On the Hot R&B singles chart, the song reached No. 15.

Charts

Weekly charts

Year-end charts

Pop culture references

The song references the lyrics of "Never Too Much" by Luther Vandross.
Rapper Redman references "Who Am I" in "I'll Bee Dat", on his 1998 album Doc's da Name 2000, which was also released as a single. The track begins with a string of expletives, then "Sim Simma, who got the keys to my Beemer?". The lyrics are an allusion to the first line of the song's chorus.
Rapper Nelly also alludes to the song's chorus in his 2000 rap single "Country Grammar (Hot Shit) with the line, "Keys to my Beemer, man, holla at Beenie Man".
Rapper Petey Pablo begins the first verse of his song "Raise Up" with the line, "Who am I? Petey Pab, motherfucka!", an allusion to the second line of the song's chorus, "Who am I? The girl dem sugah!"
Dancehall artist Sean Paul also uses Harding's "Playground Riddim" for his reggae song "Infiltrate" from his 2000 album Stage One. That same instrumental can also be heard at the beginning of the music video for his single, "Like Glue".
The song references Missy Elliott, on her debut single "The Rain (Supa Dupa Fly)" in 1997 in the second verse, with the line "Beep Beep, who got the keys to the jeep?, V-rooooom".
UK rapper Sneakbo refers to the song in his Top 40 hit "Zim Zimma" in his line, "Zim Zimma I could do it like Beenie"
UK grime crew Slew Dem released "Playground" as a single in December 2012 through the record label "No Hats, No Hoods". Produced by Spooky, the song heavily samples the original Playground riddim.
UK rap duo Krept & Konan's 2015 song "Freak of the Week" featuring American singer Jeremih heavily samples the song.
UK singer Mahalia heavily sampled the song in her 2019 single "Simmer" featuring Nigerian Afrobeat Artist Burna Boy
American rapper Joyner Lucas' 2020 single "Zim Zimma (Evolution)" alludes to the song by incorporating the opening line, "Zim Zimma, who got the keys to my motherfuckin' Beamer?" for its chorus.
American rapper Logic's 2018 song "The Return" alludes to the song with the 6th line into the 1st verse with, "Like, la-di-da-di, who got the keys to my Audi?", This is also a reference to Doug E. Fresh & The Get Fresh Crew’s 1985 hit “La Di Da Di.”.
Brockhampton's 2021 song "Sex" references the "sim simma" lyric.

References

External links

1997 songs
1998 singles
Beenie Man songs